Subway Israel was a fast food sandwich chain, an international franchise of Subway. Opening in 1992, they expanded to 23 branches around Israel before they closed in 2004.

History
In the early 1990s, Subway began expanding their international franchises at a much more rapid pace, with Israel being one of those places. 

In 1992 Subway entered Israel for the first time. In 2004, when the original franchisee died, the chain closed their 23 locations.

Kashrut
Although not all restaurants in Israel were kosher, all did refrain from pig products. Not wanting to ostracize itself from the Jewish residents of Israel, Subway did not offer bacon or ham.

Other kosher Subways
Outside of Israel, the only other kosher Subways are located in the United States, which opened its first location in 2006 in a suburb of Cleveland, Ohio. Subway spokesman Jared Fogle attended the opening of the first kosher Subway branch at the Mandel JCC of Cleveland. Subway's press release on the opening stated, "With slight modifications, such as no pork-based products, and the use of soy-based cheese product, the menu is virtually identical to that of any other Subway restaurant."

There had been 11 branches in August 2009, and peaked at 12 branches. Soon after, they began closing, however, and were down to 5 by August 2011.

Many issues have led the US branches to close. One of the main issues is that 4.5% of all sales are paid to Subway corporate for advertising; however, they received no benefits from the advertising since it was not kosher-specific. Additionally, due to the higher cost of kosher meat, non-kosher consumers stayed away due to the lack of participation in the "Five-Dollar Footlong" promotion.

Reemergence attempts
In May 2009 it was announced that a new investor, Gur Gal, had purchased the franchise rights to Subway in Israel. The new investor had rented space in Herzliya and was in talks to rent additional space in on Rothschild Boulevard in Tel Aviv. His plans stated he would eventually open 130 branches around Israel. The new locations never opened, and a lawsuit between Gur Gal and Subway was settled in arbitration, with no details released.

In June 2014, it was once again announced that Subway was looking to return to Israel and was looking for franchises.

See also

Culture of Israel
Israeli cuisine
Economy of Israel
 List of restaurants in Israel

References 

Subway (restaurant)
Defunct restaurant chains in Israel